Antona celena is a moth of the subfamily Arctiinae first described by Francis Walker in 1854. It is found in Suriname, the Amazon basin, Bolivia and Peru.

References

Lithosiini
Moths described in 1854
Moths of South America